Zoe Gillings-Brier ( Gillings, born 14 June 1985) is a Manx and British snowboarder. 
She won seven medals at the FIS World Cup including one gold. Gillings competed at the 2006, 2010, 2014, and the 2018 Winter Olympics making her the only British snowboarder to compete in 4 Olympics.

Career
Gillings was born in the Isle of Man and began snowboarding at the age of 10, after switching from skiing. She competes in snowboard cross, and has won seven medals at the FIS Snowboard World Cup. At the 2006 Winter Olympics, Gillings finished 15th in the first ever women's snowboard cross event. In the 2007/08 season, her best results were 6th at the X Games in Colorado, US, 4th in the Korean (Sungwoo) FIS World Cup final, and 2nd in the Japan (Gugi-Gifu) FIS World Cup snowboardcross final. She was awarded British Olympic Association Athlete of the Year (Snowsport) 2007/08. In the 2008/09 season, she finished 3rd in the FIS World Cup meetings in Valmalenco, Italy and Bad Gastein, Austria, and won the German National Championships. She was awarded the British Olympic Association Athlete of the Year (Snow sport) for the second successive year. At the 2010 Winter Olympics, Gillings finished 8th in the women's event. In 2010/11, she finished 3rd in a World Cup meeting in Arosa, Switzerland, and in 2011/12, she finished 3rd in the boarder-cross World Cup event in Valmalenco. At the 2014 Winter Olympics, Gillings finished 9th in the women's event; she missed out on the final on a photo finish. After the Games, Gillings lost her Olympic funding. Gillings-Brier has been selected for the 2018 Winter Olympics in Pyeongchang, South Korea, making her the first British snowboarder to compete at four Winter Olympics.

Personal life
Gillings was homeschooled. Gillings married her coach Dan Brier in August 2014, after which she changed her surname to Gillings-Brier. In August 2016, the couple had their first child.

References

External links
 
 
 
 

1985 births
Living people
Manx snowboarders
Manx sportswomen
British female snowboarders
Snowboarders at the 2006 Winter Olympics
Snowboarders at the 2010 Winter Olympics
Snowboarders at the 2014 Winter Olympics
Olympic snowboarders of Great Britain
Snowboarders at the 2018 Winter Olympics